Comilla District, officially known as Cumilla District, is a district of Bangladesh located about 100 kilometres south east of Dhaka. Comilla is bordered by Brahmanbaria and Narayanganj districts to the north, Noakhali and Feni districts to the south, Tripura of India to the east and Munshiganj and Chandpur districts to the west. Comilla district is located in the southeastern part of Bangladesh.

History

The name Comilla is derived from the Bengali word Komolangko, the previous ancient name of the region, which means 'lotus pond'. The present Comilla is a district under the Chittagong Division. It was once under ancient Samatata and later became part of the state of Tripura. As far as is known from the ancient archeology found in the region, Gupta emperors ruled Tripura since the fifth century AD. According to historians, the Buddhist Deva dynasty ruled the region from the seventh to the middle of the eighth century. In the ninth century, Comilla came under the control of the kings of Harikela and then ruled by the Chandra dynasty during the tenth and mid-eleventh century AD. Later on, it was ruled by the Mughals and then it came under the rule of East India Company in 1765.

In order to facilitate revenue collection, the company hired a district collector in the province in 1769. Comilla then belonged to the province of Dhaka. Comilla was made under the office of the district collector in 1776. The Tripura Collector's journey began with the formation of Tippera or Tipperah district of Bengal by the British in 1790. According to the Third Regulation in 1793, a civil judge was appointed for the Tripura district and in that year he was given magisterial powers. In 1837, the posts of magistrates and collectors were separated. In 1859, these two posts were merged again. After the partition in 1947, the district was renamed Comilla in 1960 and the post of district magistrate and collector was named deputy commissioner. Chandpur and Brahmanbaria sub-divisions of this district became districts in 1984.

Geography and climate
Comilla has a total area of 3146.30.17 square kilometres. It is bounded by Brahmanbaria district and Narayanganj district of Dhaka division to the north, Munshiganj district of Dhaka division and Chandpur district to the west, Noakhali and Feni districts to the south and the Indian state of Tripura to the east. The district headquarters of Comilla is located close to the Indian border, with the town of Sonamura on the other side. Major rivers passing through Comilla include the Gumti and the Little Feni. It is hot in summer and cold in winter.

The district is primarily plain land.

Administration
The administrative headquarters of Comilla are located in the city of Comilla which has a total area of 11.47 square kilometres. It consists of 18 mouzas and 3 wards. Comilla thana was officially converted into an upazila in 1983 which contains one municipality, 18 wards, 19 union parishads, 452 mouzas, and 458 villages.

Administrator of Zila Parishad: M. Omar Faruque

Deputy Commissioner (DC): Md Jahangir Alam

Subdistricts
Comilla district consists of the following Upazilas:
Barura Upazila
Brahmanpara Upazila
Burichong Upazila
Comilla Sadar Upazila
Comilla Sadar Dakshin Upazila
Chandina Upazila
Chauddagram Upazila
Daudkandi Upazila
Debidwar Upazila
Homna Upazila
Laksam Upazila
Lalmai Upazila
Monohorgonj Upazila
Meghna Upazila
Muradnagar Upazila
Nangalkot Upazila
Titas Upazila

Demographics 

According to the 2011 Bangladesh census, Comilla District had a population of 5,387,288, of which 2,575,018 were males and 2,812,270 females. Rural population was 4,546,962 (84.40%) while the urban population was 840,326 (15.60%). Comilla district had a literacy rate of 53.32% for the population 7 years and above: 54.08% for males and 52.65% for females.

Muslims make up 95.10% of the population, while Hindus are 4.79% of the total population. There are nearly 5,000 Buddhists in the district.

Economy

Mainly based on agriculture, the economy of Comilla has flourished through trade and cottage industries, especially the 'Khadi' textile. The export zone employs 20 thousand people as of 2013.

Places of interest
Landmarks include Kotbari, a cantonment, or military installation and Kandirpar, considered the heart of the Comilla district. Ancient Buddhist monastery ruins are the major attraction of Mainamati, near Kotbari. There is an ancient Hindu Temple named Comilla Jagannath Temple located on East Bibirbazar Road. There is also the recently constructed Allah Chattar, a tower in Muradnagar.

British Army soldiers killed during the fight with the Japanese Army at the Burma (Myanmar) frontier were buried here. Pashchimgaon Nawab Bari, the place of only lady Jaminder Nawab Faizunnesa, a poet, educationist and a philanthropist.

Kazi Nazrul Islam, the national poet of Bangladesh, passed a significant time of his life in this town. Both his wives, Promila Devi and Nargis, hailed from this district.

Comilla Victoria College and Comilla Zilla School are here, the latter since 1837. Bangladesh Academy for Rural Development (BARD) is situated in Kotbari. The area saw the development of Comilla Model.

Education 
 Comilla University
 Comilla Medical College
 Comilla Victoria Government College
 Comilla Government Women's College
 Bangladesh Army International University of Science & Technology
 Comilla Polytechnic Institute
 Comilla Government College
 Comilla Government Women's College
 Comilla Cadet College
 Comilla Zilla School
 Chandina Pilot High School
Nawab Faizunnesa Government College
Laksam Pilot High School

Notable people

The following people were either born or stayed in this district for a significant span of their lifetime:
 Khondaker Mostaq Ahmad, 5th President of Bangladesh (15 August 1975 to 3 November 1975).
 Ferdous Ahmed - film actor
 Kazi Zafar Ahmed: former Prime Minister
 Kamrul Ahsan : secretary to the government and now serving as Bangladesh Ambassador to Russia. Earlier served as High Commissioner to Canada and Singapore.
 Buddhadeb Basu (1908–1974): Bengali poet, novelist, essayist, translator and editor.
 General Iqbal Karim Bhuiyan : former chief of Army Staff
 Sachin Dev Burman (1906–1975): singer, composer and music director.
 Sabitri Chatterjee: actress in Indian Bengali film, TV serial and theatre.
 Nawab Faizunnesa Choudhurani (1834–1903): poet and philanthropist.
 Alaka Das, artist of classical music, principal of Sangeet Shikhharthee Sammilan (সঙ্গীত শিক্ষার্থী সম্মেলন) Talpukur Par, Comilla
 Shib Narayan Das: The designer of the first national flag of Bangladesh in 1971, a freedom fighter and political activist
 Sudhin Das, Swaralipikar of Nazrul Sangeet, awarded by Ekushe Padak
 Dhirendranath Datta (1886–1971): political leader, provincial minister of the than East Pakistan, Language Movement activist and lawyer.
 Muhammad Hasanuzzaman (1900–1968), politician and educationist
 Kazi Shamsul Hoque eminent journalist, founder editor of weekly Akhon Samoy, New York.
 Akbar Hossain BP: former minister of Bangladesh Government.
 Abdul Gani: (1919 – 1957) was a Bengali military officer. He was the founder and the first in-charge of one of the pioneer companies of 1st East Bengal Regiment.
 Sagarmoy Ghosh : Bengali editor and author
 Atiqul Islam - Mayor, Dhaka North City Corporation
 Md Mainul Islam - former chief, Border Guards Bangladesh
 Md. Tafazzul Islam - 17th Chief Justice of Bangladesh.
 AKM Bazlul Karim - theater personality
 Akhtar Hameed Khan (1914–1999): social reformer and development activist. He is from U.P -undivided India, but spent an important part of his life as asst magistrate (ICS) and thereafter as principal Victoria College and creator of co-operative programme and BARD at Comilla.
 Abul Manzoor, sector commander during Bangladesh War of Independence and decorated with the award Bir Uttom, was born in Comilla.

See also
 List of educational institutions in Comilla

Notes

References

External links

 Bangladesh Academy for Rural Development

 
Districts of Chittagong Division
Districts of Bangladesh
Districts of Bangladesh established before 1971